Šljivno may refer to:
 Šljivno (Banja Luka)
 Šljivno (Rogatica)